The Supermarine Type 224 was an inverted gull-wing monoplane fighter aircraft designed by R.J. Mitchell at Supermarine in response to Air Ministry Specification F.7/30, which sought a fighter for introduction to succeed the Gloster Gauntlet. It was powered by the Rolls-Royce Goshawk engine, which used an experimental evaporative cooling system, and problems with this system, combined with its disappointing performance, led to it being rejected, a contract for production aircraft eventually going to the Gloster Gladiator. It is nevertheless notable because R.J. Mitchell learnt lessons from its failure that were to contribute greatly to his success with the Supermarine Spitfire.

Design and development

Specification F.7/30, which was formally issued to the aircraft industry in October 1931, called for an all-metal day and night fighter armed with four machine guns, a high top speed and rate of climb, and a landing speed of less than 60 mph. The importance of a good view from the cockpit was made clear. Although the use of any power plant was permitted, the Air Ministry did express a preference for the evaporatively cooled Rolls-Royce Goshawk then being developed.

Of the many proposals submitted by manufacturers, three were selected for official development as prototypes, the Supermarine 224 among them. In addition, privately funded submissions for the competition were encouraged. R. J. Mitchell, Supermarine's designer, came up with a clean-looking inverted gull-wing monoplane with a fixed undercarriage powered by the 600 hp Goshawk II.

The gull wing configuration was chosen in order to shorten the undercarriage legs and so reduce drag, but since this configuration was known to be liable to produce problems with lateral stability an extensive programme of wind-tunnel testing using models was carried out before arriving at the final design. These tests also revealed a lack of directional stability: Mitchell accordingly enlarged the fin area.

The cockpit was open, and further wind-tunnel tests were also carried out on a full-size model of the cockpit area to ensure that the pilot would not be subjected to undue buffeting. The fuselage was of monocoque construction, with one pair of guns mounted either side of the cockpit and the other pair in the 'trouser' fairings of the undercarriage.

The wing was of unusual construction, having a single main spar, forward of which  the condensers of the engine cooling system formed the entire leading edge of the wing, the combination of the two producing a 'D-box' spar of great torsional rigidity. Behind the main spar the wing was fabric-covered.

The evaporative cooling system used by the Goshawk involved allowing the cooling water to reach a temperature greater than 100 °C without boiling by keeping it under pressure while circulating through the engine: this superheated water was then allowed to boil off by releasing the pressure, the resulting steam then being cooled in a condenser, collected as water and then recirculated through the engine.

The system had been experimentally flown in other aircraft, but these were all biplanes, and the condensers and collector tank for the condensed water were all mounted in the upper wing. In the Type 224 the collector tanks were in the undercarriage fairings, and, as the condensed water was nearly at boiling point, it was liable to turn to steam under any slight change of pressure; this frequently occurred in the water pumps and would cause them to stop working.

Competition

The Type 224 first flew on 19 February 1934, piloted by "Mutt" Summers.

The aircraft which was chosen for production, the radial-engined Gloster Gladiator, was a late entrant to the F.7/30 competition, making its first flight on 12 September 1934 and was a rapidly undertaken development of the aircraft the competition was intended to provide a replacement for.

However, Mitchell was already in discussions about a number of improvements - these included a new wing, tailplane, and engine arrangements - which would give it a top speed of 265 mph (426 km/h). The Ministry felt that, as eight rather than four guns would be needed, a wholly new aircraft, rather than a modification of the Type 224, was called for.

In 1933, Supermarine had asked the Air Ministry for the name "Spitfire" to be reserved for it. The Type 224 ended its career as a target on a firing range at Orford Ness, Suffolk in summer 1937.

Specifications (Supermarine Type 224)

See also

References

Bibliography

Buttler, T. British Secret Projects: fighters and bombers 1935-1955. Midland, 2004. 

Mason, Francis K. The British Fighter since 1912. London: Putnam, 1992. .
Mitchell, Gordon. R.J. Mitchell: Schooldays to Spitfire. London: Tempus Publishing, 2009. .
Price, Alfred. The Spitfire Story: Second edition. London: Arms and Armour Press Ltd., 1986. .

External links

Supermarine Type 224 - Colour drawing and description

1930s British fighter aircraft
Type 224
Inverted gull-wing aircraft
Cancelled military aircraft projects of the United Kingdom
Single-engined tractor aircraft
Low-wing aircraft
Aircraft first flown in 1934